Saint Lupus of Sens (or Saint Loup de Sens) (born c. 573; died c. 623) was the nineteenth bishop of Sens.

Life
He was the son of Betton, Count of Tonnerre, "Blessed Betto," a member of the royal house of the Kingdom of Burgundy.
He distinguished himself by his tact and firmness in dealing with the rival Merovingian Princes of his time.

Church in Saint-Loup-de-Naud

The Romanesque church dedicated to Saint Loup at Naud, 8 km from Provins in Champagne in the east of France is distinguished by the outstanding sculptures in the porch of its great doorway, with an ambitious iconographic program in which Saint Loup mediates entry into the mystery of the Trinity. About 980, Sevinus, archbishop of Sens, made a gift to the Benedictine community of the abbey of Saint-Pierre-le-Vif at Sens of four altars in villa que dicitus Naudus, in honore sancti lupi consecratum—"in the demesne that is called Naud, consecrated in honor of Saint Loup"—betokening the presence of a shrine already on this site, a priory under the direction of the abbot of Saint-Pierre-le-Vif. Other documents mention Saint-Loup-de-Naud among the possessions of the abbey at Sens, seat of an archbishop with close political ties to the French Crown, who had Paris within his diocese. Thus, though it lay so close to Provins, a seat of the counts of Champagne and the abbey church was completed by Henri le Libéral, comte de Champagne, the priory at Saint-Loup-de-Naud looked to Sens for its patronage: a visit from the abbot is documented in 1120. In 1160/61 Hugues de Toucy, Archbishop of Sens, presented to the priory the relic of Saint Loup, brought from the abbey of Sainte-Colombe, to that community's dismay; the sculpted portail with an iconography comparable to the royal portal at Chartres was doubtless undertaken shortly thereafter, when pilgrimages brought wealth to the community.

The priory was laid waste by the English in 1432, during the Hundred Years' War and again by the Huguenots in 1567, during the French Wars of Religion.

Other saints Lupus/Loup

Numerous communes of France are named Saint-Loup; they commemorate several venerable early saints with the Latinized Germanic name of Lupus ("wolf"): besides Saint Loup de Sens, venerated in Champagne, Île-de-France and Picardy there are Saint Loup de Troyes, Saint Loup de Bayeux, one of the early Bishops of Bayeux; and—more locally venerated—Saint Loup de Limoges, Saint Loup de Soissons, and Saint Loup de Châlons-en-Champagne. A number of the communes called Saint-Loup in the west of France are not easily connected with a specific Saint Loup. However, the account of his life in da Voragine's 'Golden Legend' refers to his exile in the northwest, from which one or more of the sites named for him in Bretagne might have claimed a connection.

See also

References

External links

 "Saint loup de Naud" the Romanesque church.
 "Les Rencontres de Provins" A website devoted to all the Saints Loup.

623 deaths
7th-century Burgundian bishops
7th-century Frankish saints
Bishops of Sens
Year of birth unknown